Finland was represented by Päivi Paunu and Kim Floor, with the song "Muistathan", at the 1972 Eurovision Song Contest, which took place on 25 March in Edinburgh.

Before Eurovision

National final
The Finnish national final was held on 29th January at the YLE TV Studios in Helsinki, hosted by Aarre Elo. The winner was chosen by postcard voting. The results were announced on 5th February.

At Eurovision
On the night of the final Päivi Paunu and Kim Floor performed 10th in the running order, following Malta and preceding Austria. The entry was conducted by Ossi Runne. At the close of voting, Finland picked up 78 points and placed 12th of the 18 entries.

Voting

Sources
Viisukuppila- Muistathan: Suomen karsinnat 1972 
Finnish national final 1972 on natfinals

1972
Countries in the Eurovision Song Contest 1972
Eurovision